Angels in the Flesh and Devils in the Bone is the third studio album by American rock band Floater, released on April 7, 1998. It is a concept album that describes the birth, life, death, and rebirth of an unnamed person, presumed to be a religious figure. Angels was re-released in late 2001 with new artwork.

Track listing
 "Endless I" – 2:27
 "The Watching Song" – 2:53
 "American Theatric" – 6:32
 "The Feast" – 4:24
 "The Beast" – 1:37
 "Minister" – 4:53
 "Medicine Woman" – 3:19
 "Nothing" - 1:49
 "Mexican Bus" – 2:44
 "The Invitation" – 5:08
 "Golden Head" – 2:30
 "Settling" – 3:45
 "The Last Time" – 3:43
 "Our Hero's Resolve" – 2:37
 "Mosquito" – 7:40
 "The Possum's Funeral" – 1:52
 "Endless II" – 4:45

Tracks 14 and 8 were originally a single song called "Oof".

References

[ AMG]

1998 albums
Floater (band) albums
Elemental Records albums